Gondolellidae is an extinct family of conodonts in the order Ozarkodinida. There are three subfamilies:  Mullerinae, Neogondolellinae and Novispathodinae.

References

External links 

 
 

Ozarkodinida families